Parachute is the fifth studio album by the English rock band Pretty Things, released in 1970. It is their first album without guitarist Dick Taylor.

Reviews at the time of release were very positive, with Billboard calling it "another top-flight album" for the band. In 1975, Rolling Stone critic Steve Turner wrote that it had been "a Rolling Stone 'album of the year'," though in fact Parachute did not place among the magazine's Albums of the Year for 1970 or 1971, and indeed was not mentioned in Rolling Stone until Stephen Holden called it an "obscure underground classic" in his review of Freeway Madness.

The band's lineup at this point was Phil May, Wally Waller, John Povey, Vic Unitt, and Skip Alan.

In 1976, the record was packaged as a double LP with their previous album S.F. Sorrow titled Real Pretty. In Canada, this album was on Motown Records.

Snapper Records released a 40th anniversary double CD in September 2010 which included acoustic reworkings of various tracks recorded in May 2010 by Wally Waller and Phil May.

Track listing 
All songs by Phil May and Wally Waller, except where noted. Adapted from original UK pressing.

Bonus tracks on 2000 reissue
"Blue Serge Blues" (May, Waller, Jon Povey) – 3:55
"October 26" – 4:57
"Cold Stone" (May, Waller, Pete Tolson) – 3:11
"Stone–Hearted Mama" – 3:29
"Summer Time" (May, Waller, Tolson) – 4:29
"Circus Mind" (May, Tolson) – 2:00

Note: many subsequent pressings of the album separated the medleys on Side A into three tracks each.

Personnel
Pretty Things
 Phil May – vocals
 Vic Unitt – guitars [album tracks only]
 Wally Waller – bass, guitar, vocals
 Jon Povey – keyboards, vocals
 Skip Alan – drums
 Pete Tolson – guitars [bonus tracks only]

Technical
Tony Clark – engineer
Nick Webb – assistant engineer
Hipgnosis – cover design, photography

References

1970 albums
Pretty Things albums
Albums with cover art by Hipgnosis
Harvest Records albums
EMI Records albums
Albums produced by Norman Smith (record producer)
Victor Entertainment albums
Psychedelic rock albums by English artists